Scott Sandison (born February 14, 1979 in Toronto, Ontario) is a field hockey midfielder from Canada.  He was a member of the Canadian team that finished tenth at the 2008 Summer Olympics.

International senior competitions
 2002 — Commonwealth Games, Manchester (6th)
 2003 — Indoor World Cup, Leipzig (6th)
 2004 — Olympic Qualifying Tournament, Madrid (11th)
 2006 — Commonwealth Games, Melbourne (9th)
 2007 — Pan American Games, Rio de Janeiro (1st)
 2008 — Olympic Games, Beijing (10th)

References

External links
 

1979 births
Living people
Canadian male field hockey players
Canadian people of Scottish descent
Field hockey players from Toronto
Field hockey players at the 2002 Commonwealth Games
Field hockey players at the 2006 Commonwealth Games
Field hockey players at the 2007 Pan American Games
Field hockey players at the 2008 Summer Olympics
Olympic field hockey players of Canada
Commonwealth Games competitors for Canada
Pan American Games gold medalists for Canada
Pan American Games medalists in field hockey
Medalists at the 2007 Pan American Games
2010 Men's Hockey World Cup players